Bocsig is a commune in Arad County, Romania.

Population
According to the 2002 census, the population of the commune counts 3553 inhabitants, out of which 90.3% are Romanians, 2.7% Hungarians, 6.8% Roma, and 0.2% are of other or undeclared nationalities.

History
The first documentary record of the locality Bocsig dates back to 1553. Mânerău was mentioned in documents in 1341, while Răpsig in 1553.

Natives
 Ion Vidu (1863–1931), composer and choral conductor

Economy
Although the economy of the commune is mainly agricultural, the secondary and tertiary economic sectors have also developed since the 1990s.

Tourism
There is a castle in Bocsig, built in the 19th century in late Renaissance style. The commune is also on the Crișul Alb River valley.

References

Communes in Arad County
Localities in Crișana